is a Japanese model and TV personality.

Biography
She was born in Hiroshima, Japan and started her modeling career after her high school graduation. She is working exclusively for the fashion magazine Classy. She has also appeared in several dramas and TV commercials. She is fluent in five languages: Japanese, Chinese, Korean, Mongolian and English. At the age of 19, Sayo left her village, pursuing her goal to be a model.

References
Official Site
Be Happy

1978 births
Living people
People from Hiroshima
Japanese female models
Japanese television personalities
Japanese actresses